Marguerite Ludovia Dale (22 October 1883 – 13 May 1963) was an Australian playwright and feminist.

The daughter of Charles Ludovia Hume and his wife Celia Annie Maltby, she was born Marguerite Ludovia Hume in Boorowa. Her great-uncle was the explorer, Hamilton Hume. She was educated at home by governesses and then attended Ascham School in Sydney. Following her mother's death in 1904, she ran the family household. In 1907, she married George Samuel Evans Dale (d.1944), a solicitor; the couple lived in Chatswood and had two daughters.

Dale campaigned for the early closing of hotels which was introduced in 1916 and helped lobby for the Women's Legal Status Act of 1918. She was active in the Women's Reform League of New South Wales and became president of the league in 1923. She was active in the Workers' Educational Association, the National Council of Women of Australia and the Australian Federation of Women's Societies for Equal Citizenship. In 1922, she was named an alternate delegate to the League of Nations and addressed the assembly on white slavery. Around 1924, she spent 18 months in a sanatorium in Geneva due to poor health.

In 1935, she became the first Australian woman to take a commercial air flight to London.

She died in Neutral Bay at the age of 79.

Writing
Dale's first play, Secondary Considerations, was chosen by Gregan McMahon for performance by the Sydney Repertory Theatre in 1921.

Dale’s 1934 play, Meet as Lovers, was performed at the Savoy Theatre, Sydney as a fund-raiser for the Blind Institute. Her daughter, Philippa, an amateur actress, filled the leading role portraying an ingenue.

She edited A Year in Australia, a memoir by Swedish writer .

Works
Dale wrote a number of plays which were performed in Sydney:

Secondary Considerations, 1921
The Mainstay, 1922; also performed in London; and in Uppsala in Swedish in 1929
The Will of the Wisp, 1927
Mostly Fools, 1930
Vive le Mari or Nothing Like a Husband, 1930
Paris in the Air, 1930
Meet as Lovers, 1934

References

External links 
 

1883 births
1963 deaths
Australian women dramatists and playwrights
Australian feminists
19th-century Australian women
20th-century Australian women
People educated at Ascham School